Wola  is a village in the administrative district of Gmina Pelplin, within Tczew County, Pomeranian Voivodeship, in northern Poland. It is located within the ethnocultural region of Kociewie in the historic region of Pomerania.

For details of the history of the region, see History of Pomerania.

The village has a population of 153.

During the German occupation of Poland (World War II), on October 21, 1939, three local Poles (parish priest, parish vicar, medical doctor) were murdered in the village by the Germans (see Nazi crimes against the Polish nation).

References

Wola